Brunei Bay is on the northwestern coast of Borneo island, in Brunei and Malaysia.

Brunei Bay is located 5°00'43.44", 115°17'26.66"; east of Bandar Seri Begawan, Brunei.

It is the ocean gateway to the isolated Temburong District of Brunei, separated from the rest of Brunei by the Malaysian Sarawak State surrounding it to the bay.

A  roadway connecting the Muara and Temburong districts of Brunei, completed in 2018, crosses over the Brunei bay.

Environment
Brunei Bay contains some 8,000 ha of tidal mudflats and sandflats, seagrass beds, coral reefs, mangroves, beach forest and sandstone islets. These have been identified by BirdLife International as an Important Bird Area (IBA) because it supports significant numbers of the populations of various bird species, including Bonaparte's nightjars, lesser adjutants, Storm's storks, Chinese egrets, greater sandplovers, spotted greenshanks and roseate terns. Threats include inshore trawling, waterbird hunting, and habitat fragmentation through mangrove clearance.

References

Other sources 
 Caldecott (1987); Currie (1979a, 1979b, 1980 & 1982); Farmer (1986); Farmer et al. (1986); Howes & Sahat (in prep); Karpowicz (1985); Lindley (1982); Sahat (1987); Teng (1970 & 1971); UGL Consultants Ltd (1983).
 John R. Howes, Mohammad Jaya bin Haji Sahat and Euan G. Ross.

Bays of Brunei
Bays of Malaysia
Landforms of Sarawak
Temburong District
Brunei–Malaysia border
Important Bird Areas of Brunei